SkyLink Aviation Inc. is a Canadian-based international aviation group offering project management, air charters, aviation support, aircraft maintenance, air charter, flight planning and clearance services.

SkyLink Aviation has been contracted to perform deployment of peacekeepers and international humanitarian aid, including food and equipment, during war, major disasters and pandemics for clients including the United Nations, World Food Programme, USAID, United States Immigration and Naturalization Service (Homeland Security), IOM, the Canadian Government, the Red Cross, the Italian Interior Ministry and other national governments and various NGOs.

Ground operations

Following the American control and since 2002, Skylink Aviation has been providing ground operations and fuel supply at select airports in Iraq, Saudi Arabia, Afghanistan, Lebanon, Kuwait, Somalia, Mozambique, Angola, Rwanda, Western Sahara, Ivory Coast, Sudan (including the Darfur Region), Peru, Cambodia, all the countries ravaged by the tsunami in 2005 and many others.

 Arbil International Airport
 Baghdad International Airport
 Basra International Airport

Critical observations

In July 1993, seven U.N. procurement officers from the agency headquarters were probed after allegations circulated that they had rigged bids to favor SkyLink. Mohamed Aly Niazi led the inquiry that concluded U.N. officials had engaged in "outright bid rigging" in promoting SkyLink's case; however, the corruption allegations were never substantiated and the employees returned to their jobs.

By Order No. 2001-A-530 dated November 16, 2001, Licence Nos. 962378 and 967142 were suspended because the certificate of insurance of the licensee on file with the Canadian Transportation Agency had expired.

On August 28, 2002, a CTA Application was filed by Skylink Aviation Inc. for cancellation of Licence Nos. 962378 and 967142. These were the licenses that permitted charter domestic and international service.

On September 14, 2005, an application was made by Skylink Jets Inc. of Fort Lauderdale, a subsidiary of SkyLink Aviation, for a license to operate a non-scheduled international service to transport passengers on a charter basis between points in the United States and points in Canada.

References

External links
Official site
Strategis profile
SkyLink & Counterpart distribute medicine to children in Iraq
SkyLink cancels CTA licence
Suspension
Reapplication

Cargo airlines of Canada
Private equity portfolio companies